Batyrov or Batyrow is a Turkic masculine surname, its feminine counterpart is Batyrova or Batyrowa. Notable people with the surname include:

Albert Batyrov (born 1981), Belarusian wrestler 
Gurbangeldi Batyrow (born 1988), Turkmen football player
Saparmyrat Batyrow (born 1954), Turkmen Minister of Textile Industry
Shadzha Batyrov (1908–1965), General Secretary of the Communist Party of Turkmenistan

Turkic-language surnames